Sebastian Eugene Savage (born December 12, 1969) is a former American football cornerback in the National Football League for the Washington Redskins.  He played college football at North Carolina State University and was drafted in the fifth round of the 1993 NFL Draft by the Buffalo Bills.

References 

1969 births
Living people
People from Union County, South Carolina
American football cornerbacks
NC State Wolfpack football players
Washington Redskins players
Rhein Fire players